Vernon Butler Jr. (born June 14, 1994) is an American football nose tackle for the New York Giants of the National Football League (NFL). He played college football at Louisiana Tech, and selected in the first round of the 2016 NFL Draft by the Carolina Panthers.

Early years
Butler attended North Pike High School in Summit, Mississippi. He played football, basketball and ran track. As a senior, he had 121 tackles and 13 sacks. Butler committed to Louisiana Tech University to play college football.

College career
As a true freshman at Louisiana Tech in 2012, Butler had 21 tackles. As a sophomore in 2013, he had 43 tackles with one sack and as a junior in 2014, he had 54 tackles and a sack. As a senior in 2015, Butler had 50 tackles with three sacks and was named first team All-Conference USA.

Professional career

Carolina Panthers
Butler was selected in the first round with the 30th overall pick by the Carolina Panthers, becoming the highest Louisiana Tech Bulldog selected since Troy Edwards in 1999.

On May 13, 2016, the Carolina Panthers signed Butler to a four-year, $8.39 million contract that includes $7.94 million guaranteed and a signing bonus of $4.30 million.

On May 2, 2019, the Panthers declined the fifth-year option on Butler's contract, making him a free agent in 2020.

On December 22, 2019, Butler was ejected after punching Jack Doyle of the Indianapolis Colts in a 38–6 loss.

Buffalo Bills
On March 27, 2020, Butler signed a two-year contract with the Buffalo Bills.

Las Vegas Raiders
Butler signed with the Las Vegas Raiders on March 23, 2022. Butler was released on August 16, 2022.

New York Giants
On November 15, 2022, the New York Giants signed Butler to their practice squad. On December 3, 2022, Butler was elevated from the practice squad for the Week 13 game against the Washington Commanders. He signed a reserve/future contract on January 22, 2023.

References

External links
Carolina Panthers bio
Louisiana Tech Bulldogs bio

1994 births
Living people
People from Summit, Mississippi
Players of American football from Mississippi
American football defensive tackles
Louisiana Tech Bulldogs football players
Carolina Panthers players
Buffalo Bills players
Las Vegas Raiders players
New York Giants players